Ed Donovan (1928–1989), commonly called "The Mole" (or "Pachy"), was an American racing engine and parts builder.

Donovan developed the first all-aluminum-block hemi designed specifically for Top Fuel drag racing.

He was posthumously inducted into the Motorsports Hall of Fame of America in 2003.

Early life 
Ed Donovan was born 1928 in Los Angeles. He was fascinated with engines from an early age.

While working for Offenhauser, Donovan became involved in drag racing, before branching out on his own.

Engine builder 
Donovan's company, Donovan Engineering, was started in 1957. He supplied top racers, including "Dyno Don" Nicholson. Donovan, along with Leo Goossen, built the first two-disk racing clutch, the first titanium valves (for which Nicholson was his first customer), and other gear.

In 1964, he built the "vaunted" Donovan Engineering Special, hiring Tom McEwen (who Donovan nicknamed "Mongoose") to drive it.

Donovan is best known for his  hemi, introduced in 1971. He copied the Chrysler , which he admired, but tried to eliminate its flaws. He developed the aluminum hemi to overcome the tendency of  Chryslers, then used by Top Fuel racers (many of them friends and customers of his), to crack their iron blocks. The first driver to use the Donovan hemi (fresh out of the milling machine) was "Kansas John" Wiebe, at the 1971 NHRA Super Nationals, where Wiebe very nearly won Top Fuel.

Donovan also built the only aluminum-block aftermarket copy of the  small-block Chevy to successfully finish the Indianapolis 500.

Donovan made little money on his developments, despite the fact the aluminum hemi becoming the effective standard drag racing engine for a generation.

Personal life 
Donovan was famously generous, always paying restaurant bills, and was willing to give his employees ("his boys") even the very shirt off his back. He also demonstrated fierce loyalty.

In addition, he was a music lover, gourmet chef, and wine connoisseur of fine wine.

His sense of humor was quirky; he once claimed to hate the name Joe, listing examples such as Paisano, Hrudka, and Mondello.

Donovan was 61 when he died, of cancer.

He was posthumously inducted into the Motorsports Hall of Fame of America in 2003.

Notes

Sources 
Obituary. Hot Rod, September 1989, pp. 132–133.

External links 
NHRA.com (Don Garlits using the Donovan hemi)
NHRA.com (Mike Dunn using the Donovan hemi)
Donovan Engines website
Jalopy Journal discussion of the Donovan

Dragster drivers
American automotive engineers
20th-century American businesspeople
American racing drivers
1928 births
1989 deaths
American automotive pioneers
Deaths from cancer in the United States
People from Los Angeles